Hitched or Ditched is a reality series that showed on The CW from May 26 to June 30, 2009. It was hosted by Tanya McQueen.

Show Format
Each episode is focusing on couples who are in long-term relationships but have not yet taken that big leap into marriage. Nominated by a friend who believes it's either time for the couple to tie to the knot or break up, each episode features a different couple who accept their friend's proposition to set a wedding date in one week's time. The series premiere gained 1.42 million viewers and a 0.7 rating in both Adults 18-49 and 18-34 demo. It was ultimately canceled after just 6 episodes.

Development
It was announced on October 13, 2008 that The CW had ordered six episodes of a new wedding-themed reality series from RDF USA and The Bachelor producer Mike Fleiss, under the working title "For Better Or Worst". On April 6, 2009 the network announced that the show will premiere during summer on Tuesday, May 25 at 9/8c after the season finale of Reaper.

Ratings

References

External links
 

2009 American television series debuts
2000s American reality television series
2009 American television series endings
Television series by Warner Horizon Television
Television series by Banijay
The CW original programming